Shanghai Review of Books is a Chinese weekly paper-magazine supplement to Shanghai's Oriental Morning Daily (东方早报) with articles on literature, culture, history, art and current affairs, including book reviews, interviews and essays. It is published as an insert in each Sunday edition of the daily. It is one of the most influential literary-intellectual magazines in China. Most of its contributors are intellectuals such as writers or scholars. One special column of the Review would introduce a personal book room in Shanghai and its owner in every issue. The foundation of the Review is inspired by The New York Review of Books and London Review of Books in early 2008. The pilot issue of the Review was published in 25 May, and the formal first issue published in 6 July. The Review celebrated its 8th anniversary in 2016. The content of the Review also updates on news website The Paper (thepaper.cn). As the print version of Oriental Morning Daily has stopped publication since 2017, the Review has completely shifted to online edition.

References

External links
  (new)
  (old)

2008 establishments in China
2017 disestablishments in China
Book review magazines
Chinese-language magazines (Simplified Chinese)
Literary magazines published in China
Weekly magazines published in China
Defunct literary magazines
Defunct magazines published in China
Magazines established in 2008
Magazines disestablished in 2017
Magazines published in Shanghai
Newspaper supplements
Online literary magazines
Online magazines with defunct print editions
Sunday magazines